Michael Theophilus Johnson (born 21 July 1965), better known as Mikey Spice, is a Jamaican reggae singer.

Biography
Spice sang in his father's church from age seven and learned to play guitar, bass, drums, trumpet, piano, saxophone, flute, and harp as a youngster. Spice began a career as a reggae musician in 1985. One of his best-known singles was a cover of Barry White's "Practice What You Preach".

Discography

Singles & EPs
Tony Rebel / Mikey Spice - Who You Are / Acting Like Strangers ((12") Roof International, 1992)
Apache Scratchie / Mikey Spice - Me No Powder / You Caught Me ((12") Roof International, 1992
You Make Me ((12") Big Ship, 1993)
I'll Be There ((12") Juggling Records, 1994
Mikey Spice & Luciano - Let's Work It Out ((12") Big Ship, 1994)
Cheat On Me ((7") Black Scorpio, 1994)
Never Say Goodbye ((12") Big Ship,1994)
Practice What You Preach (RAS Records, 1995)
When Your Lonely (Digital-B, 1995)
Smokey Joe / Mikey Spice - Smokin Hornz ((12", MP) No Smoking Records, Big Ship,1995)
Born Again (Digital-B, 1995)
Brotherman ((12") Juggling Records, 1995)
Twiggy & Mickey Spice - Let's Groove ((7") Digital-B, 1995)
I Wanna Know ((7") Digital-B, 1995)
Give It All Up ((7") Big Yard Music Group, 1995)
Mikey Spice / Marcia Griffiths - If Only You Know (Penthouse Records, 1996)
Shaggy / Mikey Spice - Shake Your Boody (Big Yard Music Group, 1996)
Jah Never Fail I ((12") Saxon Records, 1996)
Mikey Spice Featuring Shaggy / Red Fox / Private P / Big Yard Crew - Shake Your Boody / Wicked Alfred / Woman You Look Good ((12") Greensleeves Records, 1996)
Frankie Paul / Mikey Spice - One Last Memory ((12") Digital Eclipse, 1996)
Karen Smith, Mikey Spice, The Taxi Gang - Make It Easy, Easy Yourself ((7") Taxi, 1997)
Give It Up ((7") Penthouse Records, 1998)
Yes Mi Friend ("Duppy Conqueror") ((7") Big Ship, 2000)

Albums
Happiness (Ras Records, 1995)
Born Again (VP Records, 1996)
Close the Door (LP on Charm Records, 1996, CD on Jet Star Records 1998)
So Much Things To Say (Jet Star Records, 1996)
All About You (Ras, 1996)
Jah Lifted Me (VP, 1997)
Reggae Max (Jet Star Records, 1997)
Mikey Spice VS Garnet Silk : Toe 2 Toe (CD on Jet Star Records, 1998)
Harder Than Before (VP, 2000)
It's All About Time (Jet Star Records, Firehouse, 2000)
Love By You (2 LP on Teflon Records, 2003)
My Way (Charm Records, LP 2003, CD 2007)
Mikey Spice (Artists Only! 2003)
Walk A Mile (VP Records, 2008)
Love By You (CD on Ajang Music Production, 2008)
I Really Love You (Black Scorpio Records, 2012)
I Am I Said (Joe Fraser Records, 2014)

Compilations
Garnett Silk / Mikey Spice - Toe 2 Toe (LP on Charm Records, 1997)
Spice Rack (Who Dun It Records, 1998)

References

Jamaican reggae musicians
Living people
1965 births
Musicians from Kingston, Jamaica
VP Records artists